Juanita E. Thornton/Shepherd Park Neighborhood Library is part of the District of Columbia Public Library (DCPL) System. It was opened to the public on July 29, 1990. The library was named in honor of Juanita E. Thornton (December 25, 1912 – September 14, 1990), a teacher and community activist.

History 

Before 1990, neighbors living around Shepherd Park in Washington D.C. did not have a library, and they had to walk almost two miles to use the library at Takoma, Washington, D.C. In 1984, an apartment building was razed, and a Wendy's restaurant was scheduled to be constructed on the site. The next day at 6:45 a.m., Juanita E. Thornton, a former teacher with the DC Schools Public System, spoke with Hardy Franklin, at that time Director of the Department of DC Public Libraries, and told him: "We have beef, bread, booze and beer. We need another B: books". A library "would provide good mental health. It is necessary for the growth of our cities, harmony among the races, justice and peace". The slogan for the construction of the new library was "Books Not Burgers." In 1988, the land was turned over to District of Columbia Public Library (DCPL). The new library opened on July 29, 1990 with a collection of 200,000 books, tapes, records, CDs and magazines. The cost of its construction was $3.3 million, and it was designed by the firm Bryant and Bryant.

Juanita E. Thornton died one month after the library opened, on September 14, 1990. In October 1992, the library was named in her honor.

Winnell Montague, a librarian with 20 years of experience, was the first branch librarian.

2015-2016 Makeover 

Juanita E. Thornton/Shepherd Park Neighborhood Library had a makeover from Autumn 2015 to Spring 2016. The budget for the renovation was $1.1 million.

See also
 District of Columbia Public Library
 Shepherd Park
 Mount Pleasant Library (Washington, D.C.)

References

"Books Win Over Burgers" by Claudia Sandlin (The Washington Post, Thursday, October 20, 1988)
"Library to Open in Northwest: Neighbors Win ‘Books Not Burgers’ in Fight Against Planned Eatery" by Margaret Camp (The Washington Post, Thursday, July 26, 1990)
"Books Not Burgers —The Shepherd Park Branch Library Is Renamed for Community Activist Juanita E. Thornton" (DC Public Library press release, October 20, 1992)

External links
Juanita E. Thornton/Shepherd Park Neighborhood Library

Library buildings completed in 1990
Public libraries in Washington, D.C.
Shepherd Park